2135 Aristaeus (1977 HA) is an Apollo asteroid discovered on April 17, 1977, by E. F. Helin and S. J. Bus at Palomar Observatory. It is named for Aristaeus, the son of Apollo and the nymph Cyrene.

2135 Aristaeus is a potentially hazardous asteroid (PHA) because its minimum orbit intersection distance (MOID) is less than 0.05 AU and its diameter is greater than 150 meters. Its orbit is well-determined for the next several hundred years.

References

External links 
 
 
 

002135
002135
Discoveries by Schelte J. Bus
Discoveries by Eleanor F. Helin
Named minor planets
19770417